Columbia Gas Transmission is a natural gas pipeline that gathers gas in the Gulf of Mexico and transports it to New York.  Its pipelines are in Pennsylvania, New Jersey, Maryland, Ohio, Virginia and West Virginia. It is owned by TransCanada Corporation. Its FERC code is 21.

See also 
List of North American natural gas pipelines

Sources

External links

Natural gas pipelines in the United States
Natural gas pipelines in New York (state)
Natural gas pipelines in Pennsylvania
Natural gas pipelines in Ohio
Natural gas pipelines in New Jersey
Natural gas pipelines in Maryland
Natural gas pipelines in Virginia
Natural gas pipelines in West Virginia